R (Privacy International) v Investigatory Powers Tribunal [2019] UKSC 22, is a judgment of the Supreme Court of the United Kingdom.

Judgment 
Lord Sumption (with whom Lord Reed agreed) and Lord Wilson dissented.

Commentary 
Richard Ekins said the ruling "undermines the rule of law and violates the sovereignty of Parliament".

References

Citations

Bibliography

Further reading 

 
 

2019 in case law
2019 in British law
Supreme Court of the United Kingdom cases